Lievestuoreenjärvi is a medium-sized lake in Laukaa, Finland. In the southern shore there is Lievestuore village. In the eastern side of the lake there is Hyyppäänvuori hill, which forms a Natura 2000 protection area. The hill in valuable because of its scenic rocky views. From the hill it is possible to see attractive views of the lake.

See also
List of lakes in Finland

References

Landforms of Central Finland
Lakes of Laukaa